Joaquim Machado (20 February 1923 – 13 February 2015) was a Portuguese footballer who played as a midfielder. He died in February 2015 at the age of 91.

See also
List of one-club men

References

External links 
 
 

1923 births
2015 deaths
Association football midfielders
FC Porto players
Portugal international footballers
Portuguese footballers
Primeira Liga players